Jean Brunhes (born 25 October 1869, Toulouse, France-died 25 August 1930, Boulogne-Billancourt) was a French geographer. His most famous book is La géographie humaine (Human Geography). He was the director of The Archives of the Planet, an international photographic project sponsored by Albert Kahn.

Ruskin et la Bible: pour servir à l'histoire d'une pensée (1901) is a popular book by Jean and Henriette Brunhes.

References
Numa Broc, Regards sur la géographie française de la Renaissance à nos jours, Presses universitaires de Perpignan, 1995.
Musée Albert Kahn, Boulogne, Jean Brunhes autour du monde, regards d'un géographe / regards de la géographie, Vilo, Paris, 1993, 348 p.
Jean-Louis Tissier, Brunhes (Jean), in Jacques Julliard, Michel Winock (dir.), Dictionnaire des intellectuels français, Paris, Seuil, 1996, p. 195-196.
Paul Claval, André-Louis Sanguin (éd.), La Géographie française à l'époque classique (1918-1968), L'Harmattan, 1996.
https://books.google.com/books?id=G9ckCwAAQBAJ&pg=PA10&dq=jean+brunhes&hl=en&sa=X&ved=0ahUKEwjXh97A-6_bAhVQbn0KHSXiAssQ6AEIPDAE#v=onepage&q=jean%20brunhes&f=false

1869 births
1930 deaths
French geographers
Scientists from Toulouse
19th-century geographers
20th-century geographers
Human geographers